Bibrocathol (INN, trade names Noviform and Posiformin) is the substance 4,5,6,7-Tetrabrom-1,3,2-benzodioxabismol-2-ol. It contains bismuth and is used to treat eye infections and control swelling.

References

External links

Antiseptics
Bromoarenes
Bismuth compounds
Catechols
Heterocyclic compounds with 2 rings